Udea inquinatalis is a species of moth in the family Crambidae. The species was first described by Friederike Lienig and Philipp Christoph Zeller in 1846. It is found in most of Europe (except Ireland, Great Britain, the Benelux, the Iberian Peninsula and most of the Balkan Peninsula) and North America (including Quebec, Manitoba, Michigan and Minnesota).

The wingspan is 18–25 mm.

The larvae feed on Betula alba, Betula nana, Salix species, Vaccinium myrtillus and Spiraea ulmaria.

References

Moths described in 1846
inquinatalis
Moths of Europe